Israels Plads (literally Israel's Square) is a large public square in central Copenhagen, Denmark, located in the area between Nørreport station and The Lakes. Its north end is home to a covered food market while the south end is currently subject to a comprehensive redesign which will integrate it with the adjoining Ørsted Park.

History

Background
The square is located in the area which was released after Copenhagen's Bastioned Fortifications were decommissioned in the second half of the 19th century. Until then the area had remained largely undeveloped due to the enforcement of a no-built zone outside the city walls.

The Greengroceer's Market
A vegetable market, Grønttorvet, opened at Vendersgade on 26 April 1889 after the market activities had been discontinued at Christianshavns Torv.

Expansion and move
The northern part of today's Israels Plads, between Vendersgade and Frederiksborggade, was originally not part of Grønttorvet. It had a fountain and was known as Hundetorvet (literally Dog Square), presumably because it was popular with people walking their dog. In 1913, the space was incorporated into the market area.

The market at Grønttorvet closed when the new vegetable market in Valby was inaugurated on 1 October 1958.

Grønttorvet was renamed Israels Plads on 11 October 1968, the 25th anniversary of Nazi persecution of Jews in Denmark.

Buildings

The most distinctive building which faces the square is the mission house Bethesda, at 17 Rømersgade, which was completed by the architect Ludvig Knudsen for the Inner Mission in 1882. Most of the other buildings facing the square are apartment buildings built for the upper middle class in the 1870s and 1889s. An example is 1–5 Rømersgade which was designed by Julius Bagger for Hans Hansen, better known as Hellig-Hansen, a prominent developer of the time who later built the entertainment venues National and Dagmar Theatre before he went bankrupt in 1884. The buildings have rich stucco decorations.

Torvehallerne

The two market halls were designed by Hans Peter Hagens and opened in September 2011.

The following groceries are available at the market: open faced sandwiches; meat products, including rack of lamb “Lammekrone”; seafood, including fish products, prawns and lobsters; mozzarella; chocolate, dragée and ice cream. There are free public toilets beside the food market.

Landscape project
A design competition for the refurbishment of the southern portion of the square was won by the architectural firm Cobe in 2008. Their winning proposal introduces various facilities for street sports and performances as well as an organic integration with the adjoining park. The implementation of the project was delayed due to a dispute with the owner of an underground parking facility but finally went under construction in 2012 and was completed in 2014.

See also
 List of squares in Copenhagen

References

External links

 Israels Plads Syd at Danish Architecture Centre's website

Squares in Copenhagen
Streets in Copenhagen
Retail markets in Copenhagen